Lukwata (Luganda for 'sea serpent', the nominal form of kukwata, lit. 'to seize') is a legendary water-dwelling creature in Baganda folklore, said to be found in Lake Victoria of Uganda. It has been described as 20–30 feet long, with dark smooth skin and a rounded head, and known to attack fishermen and boats. It may have also been related in some way to spirits and deities related to canoes and fishing  Pieces of the Lukwata were thought to have magical properties and were revered as relics in eastern Africa.

Despite the nature of the legend, there is no scientific evidence to support the existence of Lukwata or any other similar creature in Lake Victoria. However, Lukwata remains an important part of the cultural and historical fabric of Uganda and the cultural identity of the Baganda people.

References

African folklore
East African legendary creatures
Lake Victoria
Ugandan culture
Water monsters